The July 2018 Australian federal by-elections, known colloquially as Super Saturday, were five by-elections held on 28 July 2018, to fill vacancies in the Australian House of Representatives caused by the resignations in May 2018 of five MPs. Three MPs of the Australian Labor Party and the Centre Alliance's sole MP resigned due to dual citizenship concerns after the High Court ruled on 8 May 2018 that Senator Katy Gallagher was ineligible to have been elected to the Australian Senate for being a dual citizen, in similar circumstances to four of the lower house MPs. Labor MP for Perth Tim Hammond resigned for family reasons on the same day, causing the first time ever that five by-elections would be held on the same day in Australia. All sitting MPs apart from Hammond re-contested and won the ensuing by-elections.

The governing Liberal/National Coalition did not contest the by-elections in the safe Labor seats of Fremantle and Perth, with the Liberal Party contesting the by-elections in the marginal Labor seats of Braddon and Longman, and the Centre Alliance-held Mayo. Coalition performance at the by-elections was below expectations and Malcolm Turnbull resigned as Prime Minister after losing a leadership spill less than a month later.

Results

Braddon

Fremantle

Longman

Mayo

Perth

See also 

 List of Australian federal by-elections
 2017–18 Australian parliamentary eligibility crisis
 1986 Northern Ireland by-elections
 Five Constituencies Referendum

References

External links 

 Super Saturday July 28: The Poll Bludger 24 May 2018

Australian federal by-elections
Australia, federal by-elections
2018 elections in Australia
July 2018 events in Australia